Helga Königsdorf (13 July 1938 – 4 May 2014) was an East German author and physicist.

Life
She was born in Gera, a farmer's daughter. She went into academia and was appointed to the East Berlin Academy of Sciences of the GDR from 1961 to 1990. Since 1974, she headed the Department of Probability and Mathematical Statistics. At age 40, she published her first short-story collection Meine ungehörigen Träume ("My Indecent Dreams").

Her writing peers included Christa Wolf, Brigitte Reimann and Maxie Wander, who worked on woman's rights issues in the GDR in the 70s and 80s. In 1990 she left academia to devote herself to writing full-time. Helga lived with Parkinson's disease for more than 30 years.

Awards
1985 Heinrich Mann Prize
1992 Roswitha Prize

Works

Fiction
Meine ungehörigen Träume (short stories, 1978), Aufbau-Verlag
Der Lauf der Dinge (short stories, 1982), Aufbau-Verlag
Respektloser Umgang (short stories, 1986), Aufbau-Verlag
Lichtverhältnisse (short stories, 1988), Aufbau-Verlag
Ungelegener Befund (short stories, 1990), Aufbau-Verlag
Adieu DDR (memoir, 1990)
Gleich neben Afrika (short stories, 1992), Rowohlt Berlin Verlag
Im Schatten des Regenbogens (novel, 1993), Aufbau-Verlag
Über die unverzügliche Rettung der Welt (essays, 1994), Aufbau-Verlag
Die Entsorgung der Großmutter (novel, 1997), Aufbau-Verlag
Landschaft in wechselndem Licht (memoir, 2002), Aufbau-Verlag

Math
Helga Bunke: Gewöhnliche Differentialgleichungen mit zufälligen Parametern. Akademie-Verlag, Berlin 1972.
Olaf Bunke, Helga Bunke (Hrsg.): Statistical methods of model building. Berlin 1986.
Olaf Bunke, Helga Bunke (Hrsg.): Nonlinear regression, functional relations and robust methods. 2 Bände, New York 1989.

English translations
Few of her fiction works have been translated into English. Fission was published by Northwestern University Press.

References

1938 births
2014 deaths
People from Gera
People from East Berlin
German women writers
East German writers
East German women
20th-century German women